El Corte de Madera Creek (Spanish for: The Cutting of Wood) is a small river in the Santa Cruz Mountains, San Mateo County, northern California. It is a tributary of San Gregorio Creek.

The bulk of El Corte de Madera Creek's upper watershed is in El Corte de Madera Creek Open Space Preserve of the Midpeninsula Regional Open Space District, which features popular hiking and mountain biking trails.

See also
List of watercourses in the San Francisco Bay Area

Rivers of San Mateo County, California
Midpeninsula Regional Open Space District
Santa Cruz Mountains
Rivers of Northern California